American interest in "gravity control propulsion research" intensified during the early 1950s.  Literature from that period used the terms anti-gravity, anti-gravitation, baricentric, counterbary, electrogravitics, G-projects, gravitics, gravity control, and gravity propulsion.  Their publicized goals were to discover and develop technologies and theories for the manipulation of gravity or gravity-like fields for propulsion. Although general relativity theory appeared to prohibit anti-gravity propulsion, several programs were funded to develop it through gravitation research from 1955 to 1974.  The names of many contributors to general relativity and those of the golden age of general relativity have appeared among documents about the institutions that had served as the theoretical research components of those programs.  Since its emergence in the 1950s, the existence of the related gravity control propulsion research has not been a subject of controversy for aerospace writers, critics, and conspiracy theory advocates alike, but their rationale, effectiveness, and longevity have been the objects of contested views.

Evidence of existence
Mainstream newspapers, popular magazines, technical journals, and declassified papers reported the existence of the gravity control propulsion research.  For example, the title of the March 1956 Aero Digest article about the intensified interest was "Anti-gravity Booming."  A. V. Cleaver made the following statement about the programs in his article:

What are the facts, insofar as they are publicly known, or (as at this date) knowable? Well, they seem to amount to this: The Americans have decided to look into the old science-fictional dream of gravity control, or "anti-gravity," to investigate, both theoretically and (if possible) practically the fundamental nature of gravitational fields and their relationship to electromagnetic and other phenomena – and someone (unknown to the present writer) has apparently decided to call all this study by the high-sounding name of "electro-gravitics." Unknown, too – at least unannounced – is the name of agency or individual who decided to encourage, stimulate, or sponsor this effort, also in just what way it is being done. However, that the effort is in progress there can be little doubt, and, of course, it is entirely to be welcomed.
The gravitics programs had not been evinced by any technological artifacts, such as the Project Pluto Tory IIA, the world's first nuclear ramjet.  Commemorative monuments by the Gravity Research Foundation have been the artifacts attesting to the early commitments to finding materials and methods to manipulate gravity.  The endeavor had the resources and publicity of an initiative, but writers from that period did not describe them with that term.  Gladych stated:

At least 14 United States universities and other research centers are hard at work cracking the gravity barrier.  And backing the basic research with multi-million dollar secret projects is our aircraft industry.

The writings about the gravity control propulsion research effort had disclosed the "players" and resources while prudently withholding both the specific features of the research and the identity of its coordinating body.  Publicized and telecasted conspiracy theory anecdotes have suggested much higher levels of success to the G-projects than mainstream science.

Histories

Recent historical analysis and reports have attracted attention to the agencies and firms that had participated in the gravity control propulsion research.  James E. Allen, BAE Systems consultant and engineering professor at Kingston University, referred to those programs in his history of novel propulsion systems for the journal Progress in Aerospace Sciences.  Research by Dr. David Kaiser, Associate Professor of the History of Science, Massachusetts Institute of Technology, manifested the contributions made by the  Gravity Research Foundation to the pedagogical aspects of the golden age of general relativity.  Dr. Joshua Goldberg, Syracuse University, described the Air Force's support of relativity research during that period.  Progress reports and anecdotes and Internet resumes of former visiting and staff scientists have been the sources of the history of the Research Institute for Advanced Study (RIAS).  Former aviation editor of Jane's Defence Weekly, Nick Cook, drew attention to the antigravity programs through worldwide publications of his book, The Hunt for Zero Point, and subsequent televised documentaries.  Mainstream historical accounts of the G-projects have been supplemented with conspiracy theory anecdotes.

Coetaneous literature

Lists of the research institutes, industrial sites, and policy makers along with statements from prominent physicists were provided in five comprehensive works that had been published during the early years of the gravity control propulsion research.  Aviation Studies (International) Limited, London, published a detailed report about those activities by the Gravity Research Group that was later declassified.  The Journal of the British Interplanetary Society and The Aeroplane published the propulsion survey and critical assessment of the American gravitics research by the internationally recognized astronautics historian A. V. Cleaver.  The New York Herald Tribune and Miami Herald published a series of three articles by one of the world's greatest aviation journalists of the twentieth century, Ansel Talbert.  Talbert's two series of newspaper articles took place in the midst of the policy-by-press-release era.  Neither his,  nor the writings that followed the five prominent works from that period, yielded denials and/or retractions.

UFO and conspiracy theory literature

Gravity control propulsion research had been the subject of widely published UFO  literature.  The documented testimonies of whistleblowers edited by Dr. Steven Greer, Director of the Disclosure Project; anecdotes and schematics by Mark McCandlish and Milton William Cooper; and the reports by Philip J. Corso, David Darlington, and Donald Keyhoe, famous UFO researcher, have suggested incorporation of reverse engineering of recovered extraterrestrial vehicles with the anti-gravity propulsion projects had enabled them to continue beyond 1973 to successfully manufacture antigravity vehicles.  Branches of the military and defense agencies have denied and refuted such claims.

Theoretical research agencies
Talbert indicated the rationale for the intensified interest in gravity control propulsion research had stemmed from the works of three physicists. They were Bryce DeWitt's prize-winning Gravity Research Foundation essay; the book Gravity and the Universe by Pascual Jordan; and presentations to the International Astronautical Federation by Dr. Burkhard Heim.  DeWitt's essay discouraged the pursuit of materials that shield, reflect, and/or insulate gravity and emphasized the need to encourage young physicists to pursue gravitational research.  He opened his essay with the following paragraph:

Before anyone can have the audacity to formulate even the most rudimentary plan of attack on the problem of harnessing the force of gravitation, he must understand the nature of his adversary. I take it as most axiomatic that the phenomenon of gravitation is poorly understood even by the best of minds, and the last word on it is very far indeed from having been spoken.

Several articles cited his essay during and after the gravity control propulsion research period. Within a few years facilities emerged embodying the theme of DeWitt's call for increased stimuli for research.

Physical principle surveys by Cleaver and Weyl stated the antigravity research was not based on any recognized theoretical breakthroughs. Cleaver's skepticism suggested an alternative rationale for establishing that research was based on a science fiction novel.  Weyl charged publishers with  poor journalism; attacked their terminology; and gave the highest rating for prospective physical principles for gravity control propulsion to Burkhard Heim's works.  Stambler leveled harsh criticisms against Gluraheff's gravitation hypothesis.  Talbert and other authors listed the following three agencies as the principal facilities that had conducted the theoretical research:

Gravity Research Foundation
Several articles contained expressions of gratitude for the support to the gravity control propulsion endeavor by the Gravity Research Foundation.  Even though the Foundation was a humble, non-profit organization, its creator, Roger Babson, used his wealth and influence to mobilize industries; raise private and government funding; and motivate engineers and physicists to conduct research in gravity shielding and control.  According to his autobiography: "The purpose of the Foundation is to encourage others to work on gravity problems and aid others in obtaining rewards for their efforts."

During Babson's lifetime, the Foundation conducted Gravity Day Conferences each summer; established a library on gravity; solicited essays that addressed (1.) various prospects for shielding gravity, (2.) the development and/or discovery of materials that could convert gravitational force into heat, or (3.) methods of manipulating gravity; and installed monuments at various universities that cited its antigravity focus.

Aerospace Research Laboratories 
In September, 1956, the General Physics Laboratory of the Aeronautical Research Laboratories (ARL) at Wright-Patterson Air Force Base, Dayton, Ohio, commenced an intense program to coordinate research into gravitational and unified field theories with the hiring of Joshua N. Goldberg.  Creation by ARL of Goldberg's program may have been coincidental to Talbert's disclosures of commitments to gravity control propulsion research.  The precise rationale for creating the program and justifying its budgets and personnel may never be determined.  Neither Goldberg nor the Air Force's Deputy for Scientific and Technical Information, Walter Blados, were able to locate the founding documents.  Roy Kerr, a former ARL scientist, stated the antigravity propulsion purpose of ARL was "rubbish" and that "The only real use that the USAF made of us was when some crackpot sent them a proposal for antigravity or for converting rotary motion inside a spaceship to a translational  driving system."  The December 30, 1957 issue of Product Engineering closed its report with the following statement:

Nevertheless, the Air Force is encouraging research in electrogravitics, and many companies and individuals are working on the problem. It could be that one of them will confound the experts.

During the following sixteen years, its name was changed to the Aerospace Research Laboratories. The ARL scientists produced nineteen technical reports and over seventy peer-reviewed journal articles.  The Air Force's Foreign Technical Division, and other agencies, investigated stories about Soviet attempts to understand gravity. Such actions were consistent with the paranoia of the Cold War.

The funding for the military components of the gravity control propulsion research had been terminated by the Mansfield Amendment of 1973. Black project experts, conspiracy theorists, and whistleblowers had suggested the gravity control propulsion efforts had achieved their goals and had been continued decades beyond 1973.

Research Institute for Advanced Study (RIAS) 

The Research Institute for Advanced Study (RIAS) was conceived by George S. Trimble, the vice president for aviation and advanced propulsion systems, Glenn L. Martin Company, and was placed under the direct supervision of Welcome Bender. The first person Bender hired was Louis Witten, an authority on gravitation physics.  Talbert's article had announced Trimble's completion of contractual agreements with Pascual Jordan and Burkhard Heim for RIAS.  Subsequent hires yielded a half dozen gravity researchers known as the field theory group.  Arthur C. Clarke and others stated that RIAS' assembly of talent was qualified for the task of discovering new principles that could be used to develop gravity control propulsion systems.

The quest for propulsion through gravity control was vaguely implied in various publications. Works by Cook and Cleaver summarized statements in the RIAS brochures. Cook had equated the broad range of RIAS's mission statements with those of Skunk Works. In 1958, Mallan reported "the control of the force of gravity itself for propulsion" was one of the unorthodox goals initiated by Trimble for RIAS.

RIAS was renamed the Research Institute for Advanced Studies during the sixties when the American-Marietta Company merged with Martin to become the Martin Marietta Company. The 1995 merger that yielded the Lockheed Martin Company modified its goals, but not its name.

Aerospace firms

Talbert's newspaper series and subsequent articles in technical magazines and journals listed the names of aerospace firms conducting gravity control propulsion research.

The Gravity Research Group indicated those companies had constructed "rigs" to improve the performance of Thomas Townsend Brown's gravitators through attempts to develop materials with high dielectric constants (k).  Gravity Rand Limited provided a set of guidelines to help management conduct research and nurture creativity.  Articles about the gravity propulsion research by the aerospace firms ceased after 1974. None of the companies featured in those publications had filed retractions.  The following aerospace firms have been cited in the works published from 1955 through 1974:
Bell Aircraft, Buffalo, New York.
Boeing Aircraft.
Clarke Electronics, Palm Springs, California.
Convair, San Diego.
Douglas Aircraft.
Electronics Division, Ryan Aeronautical Company, San Diego.
General Electric.
Glenn L. Martin Company, Baltimore, Maryland.
Gluhareff Helicopter & Airplane Corporation, Manhattan Beach, California.
Grumman Aircraft.
Hiller Aircraft.
Hughes Aircraft.
Lear Incorporated, Santa Monica, California.
Lockheed Aircraft Corporation.
Radio Corporation.
Sikorsky Division of United Aircraft.
Sperry Gyroscope Division of Sperry Rand Corporation, Great Neck, Long Island.

Reported breakthroughs
None of the reported experimental breakthroughs published during the 1950s and 1960s have been recognized by the aerospace community.

Experimental

Brown's gravitator
Various reports indicated Brown's gravitators were the main experimental focus of the gravity control propulsion research.  According to G. Harry Stine and Intel, research on Brown's gravitators became classified immediately after demonstrations of 30% weight reductions.  Thomas Townsend Brown had obtained a British patent for high voltage, symmetric, parallel plate capacitors, that he called gravitators, in 1928.  Brown claimed they would produce a net thrust in the direction of the anode of the capacitor that varied slightly with the positions of the Moon.  The scientific community rejected such claims as products of pseudoscience and/or misinterpretations of ion wind effects.

Independent research found small amounts of lift from Brown's gravitator based on an inefficient use of ionic propulsion. The devices were named Ion Lifters or Ionocraft and were reported to be able to lift the empty shell of a vehicle under ideal conditions, but not the additional machinery required to generate the electric field. Gravity effects were not found in the independent research.

Kaplan's gravity-like impulses
In July 1960, Missiles and Rockets reported Martin N. Kaplan, Senior Research Engineer, Electronics Division, Ryan Aeronautical Company, San Diego, had conducted anti-gravitational experiments yielding the promise of impulses, accelerations, and decelerations one hundred times the pull of gravity.  Neither comments nor criticism of the report appeared in subsequent articles during the period of intensified gravity control propulsion research (see Section 1 of tractor beam for similar reports).

Theoretical

Forward's rotational field
Robert L. Forward, Hughes Research Laboratories, Malibu, described the theoretical generation of dipole gravitational fields by accelerating a super-dense fluid through pipes wound around a torus. The proposed mechanism relies on the use of a superconducting fluid such as supercooled mercury, being quickly rotated within a circular tube whilst under a high electrical current. It is believed that this creates a powerful electromagnetic force as a torus field to envelop a craft thus effectively reducing its mass and G-forces to near zero allowing almost instantaneous acceleration and deceleration under propulsion.

Legacies
Many of the contributors to general relativity have been supported by and/or associated with the ARL, RIAS, and/or the Gravity Research Foundation.  The decades preceding the 1955 revelation of the gravity control propulsion research were a low water mark for general relativity.  The following summarizes how the components of that research had stimulated the resurgence of general relativity:

Gravity Research Foundation
Even though some of the physicists who attended the Gravity Day Conferences quietly mocked the anti-gravity mission of the Foundation, it provided significant contributions to mainstream physics.  The International Journal of Modern Physics D has featured selected papers from the Gravity Research Foundation essay competition. Many have been incorporated with the collections of the Niels Bohr Library. A few of the Foundation essay contest winners became Nobel laureates (e.g., Ilya Prigogine, Maurice Allais, George F. Smoot).    Foundation essays have been among the resources graduate students check for new ideas.  Kaiser summarized the Foundation's influence in the following manner:

Despite the vast conceptual gulf separating Babson from the new generation of relativists, we are left with intriguing, and perhaps ironic associations: by organizing conferences, sponsoring the annual essay contests, and making money and enthusiasm widely available for people interested in gravity, the eccentric Gravity Research Foundation may claim at least some small amount of the credit for helping to stimulate the postwar resurgence of interest in gravitation and general relativity.

Foundation trustee, Agnew Bahnson, contacted Dr. Bryce DeWitt with a proposal to fund the creation of a gravity research institute.  DeWitt had won the first prize for the 1953 essay contest.  The proposed name was changed to the Institute for Field Physics and it was established in 1956 at the University of North Carolina at Chapel Hill under the direction of Bryce and his wife, Cécile DeWitt-Morette.

The peer reviewed physics journal, Physica C, published a report by Eugene Podkletnov and Nieminen about gravity-like shielding.  Although their work had gained international attention, researchers were not able to replicate Podkletnov's initial conditions.  But, analyses by Giovanni Modanese and Ning Wu indicated various applications of quantum gravity theory could allow gravitational shielding phenomena. Those achievements have not been pursued by the scientific community.

Aerospace Research Laboratories (ARL)

The list of prominent contributors to the golden age of general relativity, contains the names of several scientists who had authored the nineteen ARL Technical Reports and/or seventy papers.  The ARL sponsored papers were published in the Proceedings of the Royal Society of London, Physical Review, Journal of Mathematical Physics, Physical Review Letters, Physical Review D, Review of Modern Physics, General Relativity and Gravitation, International Journal of Theoretical Physics, and Nuovo Cimento B.  Some of the ARL papers were written in collaboration with RIAS, the U.S. Army Signal Research and Development Laboratory at Fort Monmouth, New Jersey, and the Office of Naval Research.  The ARL had provided significant enhancements to general relativity theory.  For example, Roy Kerr's description of the behavior of space-time in the vicinity of a rotating mass was among those works.  Goldberg concluded: "However, it should be recognized that, in the United States, the Department of Defense played an essential role in building a strong scientific community without widespread encroachment on academic values."

Research Institute for Advanced Studies (RIAS)
The growth of nonlinear differential equations during the fifties was stimulated by RIAS.  One of the leading groups in dynamical systems and control theory, the Lefschetz Center for Dynamical Systems, was a spinoff from RIAS.  After the launch of Sputnik, world-class mathematician Solomon Lefschetz came out of retirement to join RIAS in 1958 and formed the world's largest group of mathematicians devoted to research in nonlinear differential equations.  The RIAS mathematics group stimulated the growth of nonlinear differential equations through conferences and publications.  It left RIAS in 1964 to form the Lefschetz Center for Dynamical Systems at Brown University, Providence, Rhode Island.

UFO and conspiracy theories
On May 9, 2001, Mark McCandlish testified on the televised news conference held by the Disclosure Project, at the National Press Club, Washington, D.C.  He stated gravity control propulsion research  had started in the 1950s and had successfully reverse engineered the vehicle retrieved from the Roswell crash site to build three Alien Reproduction Vehicles (ARVs) by 1981. McCandlish described their propulsion systems in terms of Thomas Townsend Brown's gravitators and provided a line drawing of its interior.  The diagram closely resembled the drawing provided earlier in Milton William Cooper's book.  Another Disclosure Project whistleblower, Philip J. Corso, stated in his book the craft retrieved from the second crash site at Roswell, New Mexico, had a propulsion system resembling Thomas Townsend Brown's gravitators.  And, Corso's book featured several gravity control propulsion statements made by Hermann Oberth.

Soon after the end of the Cold War, a small group of scientists and engineers openly expressed their desire to use technologies developed by black projects for civil applications.  Steven Greer formed the Disclosure Project in 1995 to help those and other research whistleblowers share their information with and to petition Congress. By 2001, it had provided reports to two Congressional hearings and had acquired over 400 members from branches of the military and aerospace industry.

During the early 1960s, Keyhoe published excerpts from a letter by Hermann Oberth that presented explanations for the flight characteristics of UFOs in terms of gravity control propulsion. Prior to Oberth's letter, Keyhoe had supported arguments for magnetic forces as the source of propulsion for UFOs.  The letter caused him to search for the existence of gravity control propulsion research programs.  The following is a segment of his findings he had released in his 1966 and 1974 publications:

When AF [air force] researchers fully realized the astounding possibilities, headquarters persuaded scientists, aerospace companies and technical laboratories to set up anti-gravity projects, many of them under secret contracts. Every year, the number of projects increased. In 1965, forty-six unclassified G-projects were confirmed to me by the Scientific Information Exchange of the Smithsonian Institution.  Of the forty-six, thirty-three were AF-controlled.

During his press conferences on February 2, 1955, in Bogotá and February 10, 1955, in Grand Rapids, Michigan, aviation pioneer William Lear stated one of his reasons for believing in flying saucers was the existence of American research efforts into antigravity.  Talbert's series of newspaper articles about the intensified interest in gravity control propulsion research were published during the Thanksgiving week of that year.

References

Further reading
Yi, Y. (2004, January).  An interview with Jack K. Hale.  Dynamical Systems Magazine (SIAM DSWeb Magazine).

Anti-gravity
Aerospace engineering organizations
Research and development in the United States
United States government secrecy
Science and technology-related conspiracy theories
History of physics
History of science and technology in the United States
Spacecraft propulsion
Scientific speculation
Science fiction themes
Fringe physics
Wright-Patterson Air Force Base